As used here, an experimental or research and development aircraft, sometimes also called an X-plane, is one which is designed or substantially adapted to investigate novel flight technologies.<ref>Suturtivant, Ray. British Research and Development Aircraft. Haynes. 1990.</ref>

Argentina
 FMA I.Ae. 37 glider – testbed for production fighter

Australia
 GAF Pika – manned test craft for drone program

Brazil
 Baumgartl PB-60 – towed experimental rotor kite

Canada

AEA Silver Dart (1909) – First aircraft to fly in Canada
Avro Canada Avrocar – Ducted fan VTOL
Birdman Project 102 – 
Canadair CL-52 – jet engine testbed (converted Boeing B-47)
Canadair CL-84 Dynavert – tilt-wing VTOL
de Havilland Canada C-8A – Quiet Short-Haul Research Aircraft
de Havilland Canada C-8A – Air-Cushion Landing System
de Havilland Canada C-8A – Augmentor Wing
Marsden Gemini – variable-geometry glider
NRC tailless glider – tailless flying wing
UTIAS Ornithopter No.1

France

 Aérocentre NC.130 1939 – High-altitude flight
 Aérospatiale Ludion 1967 – Thrust vectored rocket VTOL 
 Arsenal-Delanne 10 – Tandem wing
 Arsenal VG 70 – High speed research
 Arsenal O.101 – Aerodynamic research
 Arsenal 2301/SFECMAS 2301 and SFECMAS 1301 – Supersonic research glider
 Breguet-Dorand Gyroplane Laboratoire – Experimental helicopter
 Breguet-Richet Gyroplane – Experimental helicopter
  – Monoplane testbed
 Dassault Balzac V – VTOL testbed
 Dassault Mirage IIIV – VTOL testbed
 Dassault Milan – Canard research
 Dassault Mirage G – Variable geometry
 Dassault LOGIDUC – Unmanned combat aerial vehicle UCAV development
 Dassault nEUROn –  UCAV technology demonstrator
 Farman F.1010 – Heavy cannon flight testing
 Farman F.1020 – Semi-circular wing
 Fouga Gemeaux – Engine testbed
 Gastambide-Levavasseur Variable Surface Aircraft – Variable chord wing testbed
 Gérin Varivol – Variable chord wing testbed

 Hanriot HD.28 – tested a Vee tail
 Hurel-Dubois HD.10 – Very high aspect ratio wings
 Leduc 0.10 – Ramjet
 Leduc 0.21 – Ramjet
 Makhonine Mak-10 – Variable span wing
 Messier Monoplace Laboratorie – Retractable bicycle undercarriage testbed.
 Nord 500 – VTOL tilt ducted fan research aircraft
 Nord 1402/1405 Gerfaut – Delta wing research aircraft
 Nord 1500 Griffon – Ramjet
 Nord 1601 – Swept wing research aircraft
 Payen PA-22 – Tandem delta/normal wings 
 Payen Pa 49 – Tandem delta/normal wings 
 Potez-CAMS 160 – 5/13th scale six engine aerodynamic testbed for development of CAMS 161
 Robin X4 – Materials and configuration testbed
 SNECMA Atar Volant – Vertical lift jet
 SNECMA Coléoptère – Vertical lift annular wing
 Sud Est SE-1210 scale aerodynamic testbed for SE-1200 transatlantic flying boat
 Sud-Ouest Ariel – Tip-jet rotor helicopter
 Sud-Ouest Farfadet – Convertiplane
 Sud-Ouest Triton – First French jet aircraft

Germany

 Akaflieg Berlin B 9 1943. – Prone pilot
 Albatros L.81 – Elektron metal structure testbed
 AVA AF 1 – Augumented lift 
 DFS 194 1940 – Tailless rocket aircraft used in development of Me 163
 DFS 346 1948 – Supersonic reconnaissance aircraft used for research
 Dassault/Dornier Alpha Jet TransSonische Tragflügel (TST) – Transonic supercritical wing research
 Dornier Do 29 – Tilt rotor STOL

 Dornier Do 31 – Experimental VTOL transport
 EWR VJ 101 – Experimental tiltjet VTOL fighter
 Fieseler Fi 158 – Testbed for radio control system
 Flettner airplane – Magnus effect test vehicle
 Flettner Fl 185 – Gyrodyne
 Focke-Wulf F 19 – Multi-engined canard demonstrator
 Fokker V.1 – Structures and aerodynamics testbed
 Göppingen Gö 8 – Development aircraft for Do 214
 Göppingen Gö 9 – Pusher (behind tail) aerodynamic testbed for Dornier Do 335 development
 Gotha Go 147 – Tailless research aircraft

 Heinkel He 119 – High-performance research aircraft
 Heinkel He 176 – Rocket research aircraft
 Heinkel He 178 – Jet engine research aircraft
 Horten H.III – Flying wing
 Horten H.IV – Flying wing
 Horten Ho VI – Flying wing
 Junkers J 1 – Pioneering all-metal cantilever monoplane (1915)
 Junkers EF 61 – Pressurization
 Junkers Ju 49 – High-altitude test aircraft
 Lippisch Delta IV – Delta wing
 Lippisch DM-1 1944 – Delta wing glider
 Lippisch Ente – Rocket-powered canard technology demonstrator
 Lippisch P.13a – Coal-powered delta wing 
 Messerschmitt Me P.1101 – Variable geometry (swing-wing) jet
 Opel RAK.1 – Rocket propulsion technology demonstrator
 RFB X-113 – Wing in ground effect vehicle
 RFB X-114 – Wing in ground effect vehicle
 Sack AS-6 – Disk wing technology demonstrator
 Schmeidler SN.2 – Wing flaps
 VFW VAK 191B – VTOL fighter
 Zeppelin-Lindau V I – All-metal stressed skin construction

Italy

 Ambrosini Sagittario 1953 – Swept wing research aircraft 
 Bossi-Bonomi Pedaliante 1936 – Human-powered aircraft
 Caproni Campini N.1 1940 – Jet engine research 
 Jona J-6 – Tilting wing stabilisation system
 Lualdi-Tassotti ES 53 – Gyro stabilized helicopter
 Piaggio P.111 – High-altitude research
 S.C.A. SS.2 – Experimental canard 
 S.C.A. SS.3 Anitra – Experimental canard 
 Stipa-Caproni – Ducted prop research

Poland
 Flugtechnische Fertigungsgemeinschaft Prag FGP 227 – Scale proof of concept for German BV 238
 Lala-1 – Jet biplane testbed for PZL M-15 Belphegor

Japan

 Gasuden Koken 1937 – Long range experimental aircraft
 Honda MH02 1993 – Over wing engines, forward swept wing
 Kawasaki Ki-78 1942 – High speed research aircraft
 Kayaba Ku-2 1940 – Tailless glider
 Kayaba Ku-3 – Tailless glider
 Kayaba Ku-4 – Tailless research aircraft
 Kimura HK-1 – Tailless glider
 Mitsubishi RP-1 – Experimental helicopter
 MXY-6 – Canard scale testbed for Kyushu J7W 
 X1G – High-lift device based on Saab 91 Safir
 National Aerospace Laboratory (NAL) Asuka – STOL
 Shin Meiwa UF-XS – Proof of concept demonstrator for Shin Meiwa US-1A
Mitsubishi T-2CCV - Experimental aircraft for CCV technology
 Mitsubishi X-2 Shinshin – Advanced stealth technology demonstrator

Russia/Soviet Union

Alexeyev – Ekranoplans
Antonov A-40 1942 – Tank glider
Antonov 181 – Blown channel wing demonstrator
Bartini Beriev VVA-14 1972 – Ekranoplan ground effect vehicle
Bartini Stal-6 – High speed aircraft
Chyeranovskii BICh-3 – Tailless delta research aircraft
Chyeranovskii BICh-11 – Flying wing to test wingtip rudders
Chyeranovskii BICh-16 – Human-powered ornithopter
Chyeranovskii BICh-18 – Human-powered ornithopter
Chizhevski BOK-1 – High-altitude research aircraft
Chizhevski BOK-5 – Tailless research aircraft
Grigorovich I-Z – Recoilless cannon evaluation
Grushin Octyabrenok – Tandem wing
Ilyushin Il-76LL – Engine testbeds (5)
Kozlov PS – Visiblity (covered in transparent material)
MAI EMAI – Magnesium construction 
Mikoyan-Gurevich MiG-8 Utka'' – Pusher canard proof of concept (1945)
Mikoyan-Gurevich MiG-105 – Lifting body
Mikoyan Project 1.44 – Technology demonstrator
Mikoyan-Gurevich N – Mixed propulsion system

Moskalyev SAM-9 Strela – Delta wing
NIAI RK – Telescopic wings
NIAI RK-I – Telescopic wings
Nikitin PSN-2 – Glider bombers
Sukhanov Diskoplan – Disk wings
Sukhoi T-10 – Technology demonstrator
Sukhoi T-58VD – VTOL research aircraft
Sukhoi Su-47 – Technology demonstrator
Thermoplan – Heavy lift lenticular-shaped hybrid airship technology demonstrator
Tsybin LL – Forward swept wing
Tsybin NM-1 – Proof of concept 
Tupolev Tu-95LAL – Nuclear-powered aircraft
Ushakov – Flying submarines
Yakovlev Yak-36 – VTOL technology demonstrator
Yakovlev Yak-42LL – Progress D-236 propfan engine testbed
Yakovlev Yak-1000 – Supersonic technology demonstrator
Zveno project – Parasite fighters

Spain

 Cierva C.4 1923 – Experimental autogyro, first to fly
 Cierva C.6 1924 – Experimental autogyro

Sweden
 Saab 201 - Aerodynamic testbed for Saab 29 Tunnan
 Saab 202 – Aerodynamic testbed for Saab 32 Lansen 
 Saab 210 1952 – Aerodynamic testbed for double delta concept for Saab 35 Draken

Switzerland
 Solar Impulse Project – Solar power technology demonstrator

United Kingdom

Armstrong Whitworth Ape 1926 – Variable configuration aerodynamic test vehicle
Armstrong Whitworth A.W.52 1947 – Jet powered flying wing
Avro 707 1949 – Aerodynamic proof of concept for Avro Vulcan delta wing bomber
Avro Ashton – Jet engine research vehicle based on Avro Tudor
BAC 221 – High speed delta wing research
Baynes Bat – Experimental tailless glider
Blackburn B-20 – Retractable hull seaplane
Boulton Paul P.6 – Wing research
Boulton Paul P.92 – Half-scale proof of concept for turret fighter
Boulton Paul P.111 – Delta-wing research aircraft
Boulton Paul P.120 – Delta-wing research aircraft
Bristol 138 – High-altitude research aircraft
Bristol 188 – High speed flight research
British Aerospace EAP – Technology demonstrator
Cierva W.9 – Experimental helicopter with anti-torque jet efflux
de Havilland DH 108 Swallow – Swept wing tailless transsonic research aircraft
English Electric P.1A – Supersonic research aircraft
modified Fairey Battle – Engine testbed for Rolls-Royce Exe, Fairey Prince (H-16) and Napier Dagger. 
Fairey Delta 1 – Delta-wing research aircraft
Fairey Delta 2 – Delta-wing research aircraft
Fairey Jet Gyrodyne – Jet-powered rotor technology demonstrator
Folland Fo.108 – Engine test bed
General Aircraft GAL.56 –  Tailless swept wing glider
Gloster E.28/39 – Jet engine research
Gloster Meteor F8 "Prone Pilot" – Prone position flight control research
Gloster Trent Meteor – Turboprop propulsion
Hafner A.R.III Gyroplane – Experimental autogyro
Handley Page H.P.17 – Aerodynamic slot research
Handley Page H.P.20 – Aerodynamic slot research
Handley Page H.P.75 Manx – Tailless flight research
Handley Page HP.88 – Handley Page Victor aerodynamic testbed
Handley Page HP.115 – Low speed delta-wing research
Hawker P.1052 – Swept wing testbed
Hawker P.1072 – Armstrong Siddeley Snarler rocket booster testbed
Hawker P.1127 – V/STOL technology demonstrator, led to Hawker Harrier
Hillson Bi-mono – Slip-wing research
Hunting H.126 – Blown flap research
Miles M.3E Gillette Falcon – High speed flight research
Miles M.30 – Blended wing body design
Miles M.35 Libellula – Tandem-wing fighter testbed
Miles M.39B Libellula – Tandem-wing research
Miles M.52 – Supersonic flight research
Parnall Parasol – Wing pressure and aileron testing
Parnall Peto – Experimental submarine-launched aircraft.
Parnall Prawn – Flying boat testing buried engine with variable-angle thrust line
Reid and Sigrist R.S.4 Bobsleigh – Prone-pilot research
Rolls-Royce Thrust Measuring Rig – Low speed VTOL control test rig

Saro Shrimp – Experimental half-scale flying boat for development of cancelled Saunders-Roe S.38
Saunders-Roe SR.53 – Mixed rocket/jet propulsion development aircraft for cancelled Saunders-Roe SR.177
Short Cockle – Metal construction technology demonstrator for flying boats
Short Mussel – Testing metal construction techniques for aircraft floats
Short S.6 Sturgeon – Tested aluminium construction techniques for aircraft
Short S.31 – Half-scale model for Short Stirling development 
Short SB.1 – Tailless glider for isoclinic wing research
Short SB.4 Sherpa – Powered isoclinic wing research
Short SB.5 – English Electric Lightning wing research
Short SC.1 – VTOL research
Short Silver Streak – Stressed skin construction, developed into Short Springbok
Supermarine 508 – Development aircraft with vee tail
Supermarine 525 – Swept wing development aircraft for Supermarine Scimitar program
Vickers Type 618 Nene-Viking – Jet engine testbed
Vickers Type 470 and Type 486 Wellington – Whittle jet engine testbeds
Vickers Type 602 Wellington Mark X – Rolls-Royce Dart turboprop testbed
Westland-Hill Pterodactyl – Tailless monoplane testbeds
Youngman-Baynes High Lift – Youngman flap testbed

United States

X-planes

Bell X-1 – Supersonic flight and sound barrier 
Bell X-2 – Mach 2–3 supersonic flight
Douglas X-3 Stiletto – Sustained supersonic flight 
Northrop X-4 Bantam – Tailless aircraft
Bell X-5 – Variable-sweep wing
Convair X-6 – Nuclear reactor test aircraft (for nuclear-powered aircraft)
Lockheed X-7 – Unmanned ramjet and guidance test missile
Aerojet General X-8 – Sounding rocket (became Aerobee)
Bell X-9 Shrike – Guided missile
North American X-10 – Unmanned missile technology demonstrator
Convair X-11 – Single engine missile testbed for Atlas
Convair X-12 – Three engine missile testbed for Atlas
Ryan X-13 Vertijet – Tail sitter VTOL jet
Bell X-14 – Thrust vectoring VTOL jet 
North American X-15 – Hypersonic rocket-powered research aircraft (Mach 6) 
Bell X-16 - High-altitude reconnaissance jet
Lockheed X-17 – Research rocket testing high mach re-entry
Hiller X-18 – Tiltwing STOVL cargo aircraft
Curtiss-Wright X-19 – VTOL tiltrotor
X-20 Dyna-Soar – Spaceplane program
Northrop X-21 – Laminar flow wing 
Bell X-22 – Ducted fan V/STOL
Martin X-23 PRIME – Lifting body reentry vehicle testbed 
Martin Marietta X-24 – Lifting body test aircraft
Bensen X-25 – Single-seat autogyro
Schweizer X-26 Frigate – Sailplane
Lockheed X-27 Lancer – high-performance technology demonstrator based on Lockheed CL-1200
Pereira X-28A Sea Skimmer – Single-seat flying boat for US Navy

Grumman X-29 – Forward-swept wing test aircraft
Rockwell X-30 – Single-stage-to-orbit spacecraft
Rockwell-MBB X-31 – Extreme angle of attack test aircraft
Boeing X-32 – Joint Strike Fighter Program technology demonstrator
Lockheed Martin X-33 – Unmanned scale demonstrator for VentureStar single stage to orbit spacecraft
Orbital Sciences X-34 – Reusable launch vehicle testbed
Lockheed Martin X-35 – Joint Strike Fighter Program technology demonstrator, developed into F-35 Lightning II
McDonnell Douglas X-36 – Tailless fighter research agility aircraft
Boeing X-37 – Reusable unmanned spacecraft
NASA X-38 – Crew return vehicle for International Space Station (cancelled after tests)
X-39 – Reserved for USAF/DARPA program use
Boeing X-40 Space Maneuver Vehicle – Testbed for X-37 guidance and flight characteristics
X-41 Common Aero Vehicle – Classified DARPA/NASA maneuvering re-entry vehicle
X-42 Pop-Up Upper Stage – Classified rocket upper stage
NASA X-43 Hyper-X – Hypersonic scramjet
Lockheed Martin X-44 MANTA – Multi-axis tailless aircraft concept
Boeing X-45 – Unmanned combat air vehicle
Boeing X-46 – Unmanned combat air vehicle (proposal only)
Northrop Grumman X-47A Pegasus – Unmanned combat air vehicle
Northrop Grumman X-47B Iron Raven – Aircraft carrier capable unmanned combat air vehicle technology demonstrator 
Boeing X-48 – Blended wing aircraft
Piasecki X-49 – Compound helicopter technology demonstrator
Boeing X-50 Dragonfly – Gyrodyne unmanned aerial vehicle
Boeing X-51 Waverider – Mach 5+ scramjet missile demonstrator
Boeing X-53 Active Aeroelastic Wing – Wing warping flight demonstrator
Gulfstream X-54 – Supersonic boom intensity research and demonstration aircraft
Lockheed Martin X-55 – Advanced composites technology demonstrator
Lockheed Martin X-56 – Flutter suppression and gust load testing unmanned testbed
NASA X-57 Maxwell - Electric-powered light aircraft
Lockheed Martin X-59 QueSST - Low-boom supersonic aircraft
Generation Orbit X-60 - Air-launched single stage suborbital rocket vehicle
Dynetics X-61 Gremlins - Unmanned aerial vehicle
General Dynamics X-62 VISTA - Variable stability, thrust vectoring (formerly known as NF-16D VISTA)

Other experimental types

 Acme Sierra 1959 – Technology demonstrator
 AstroFlight Sunrise 1974 – Solar powered drone
 Ball-Bartoe Jetwing 1977 – Blown wing research
 Bell D-292 1985 – Advanced Composite Airframe Program
  Bell L-39 1946 – Swept wing research
 Bell Model 65 1954 – Tiltjet VTOL 
 Bell XV-15 1977 – Tiltrotor VTOL, precursor to V-22 Osprey
 Bell 533 1962 – US Army high speed helicopter experiments 
 Boeing ecoDemonstrator 2012 – Airliner fuel efficiency and noise reduction technologies
 Budd BB-1 Pioneer 1931 – Stainless steel construction
 Burnelli RB-1 1921 – Lifting body proof of concept vehicle
 Chrysler VZ-6 1959 – Ducted fan
 Convair NB-36 1955 – Nuclear propelled aircraft testbed
 Curtiss-Wright VZ-7 1958 – Quadcopter
 Curtiss-Wright X-100 1963 – Tilt rotor VTOL (developed into X-200 and X-19)
 Custer Channel Wings 1953 – Blown half-barrel wings
 Doak VZ-4 1958 – Tilt-fan VTOL 
 Douglas D-558-I Skystreak 1947 – Supersonic research
 Douglas D-558-II Skyrocket 1948 – Supersonic research
 Fairchild VZ-5 1959 – Deflected air VTOL
 Farrar LSG-1 Bird Flight Machine 1969 – Glider to research bird flight

 General Dynamics F-16XL 1982 – Relaxed stability delta wing, boundary layer suction laminar flow
 General Dynamics F-16 VISTA 1992 – Variable stability, thrust vectoring (Redesignated X-62 Vista in 2021)
 General Electric GE36 testbed 1986 – Propfan engine testbed on a modified Boeing 727
 Goodyear Inflatoplane 1956 – Inflatable rescue aircraft technology demonstrator
 Gossamer Albatross 1979 – Human-powered flight
 Gossamer Condor 1977 – Human-powered flight
 modified Grumman Gulfstream II – Engine testbed for the NASA Propfan Test Assessment (PTA)
 Hiller VZ-1 Pawnee 1955 – Direct lift rotor platform
 Hypersonic Technology Vehicle 2 2010 – Hypersonic glider
 Kaman K-125 1947 – Intermesh twin rotor helicopter, servo-flap control
 Kaman K-16 – Modified Grumman Goose for tiltwing V/STOL research
  Lockheed Altair 1938 – Twinned engine testbed (both engines were in a single cowl)
 NASA Dryden Lockheed C-140 Jetstar 1964 – Electronic variable stability, propfan engine (1981) and laminar flow wing testbed (1985)
 Lockheed Have Blue – Stealth technology demonstrator
 Lockheed Vega Winnie Mae – high-altitude research – confirmed existence of jet stream
 Lockheed QT-2 – Quiet Thruster noise suppression experiments
 Lockheed XC-35 – Pressurized cabin development

 Lockheed XV-4 Hummingbird – Jetlift VTOL
 LTV XC-142 – VTOL transport technology demonstrator
 Martin 162A Tadpole Clipper – Proof of concept aircraft
 Martin XB-26H Marauder – Tandem undercarriage
 McDonnell Douglas MD-81 UHB – General Electric GE36 and PW-Allison 578-DX propfan engine testbed
 NASA AD-1 – Oblique Wing
 NASA Environmental Research Aircraft and Sensor Technology experimental aircraft  – ALTUS, Pathfinder and Helios
 NASA Hyper III –
 NASA M2-F1 – Lifting body/re-entry vehicle
 NASA Pathfinder – Solar-powered aircraft
 Northrop F-5 Shaped Sonic Boom Demonstrator – Shockwave reduction

 Northrop HL-10 – Lifting body/re-entry vehicle research
 Northrop M2-F2 – Lifting body/re-entry vehicle research
 Northrop M2-F3 – Lifting body/re-entry vehicle research
 Northrop N-1M – Flying wing research
 Northrop N-9M – Flying wing proof of concept aircraft for Northrop YB-35 
 Northrop Tacit Blue – Stealth technology demonstrator
 Piasecki PV-2 – Helicopter technology demonstrator
 Piasecki VZ-8 Airgeep – Liftfan VTOL research
 Piasecki PA-97 1980 - Heavy lifter
 Republic XF-84H "Thunderscreech" – Supersonic propeller testbed
 Republic XF-91 Thunderceptor – Inversely tapered swept wing
 Rockwell HiMAT – Maneuverability and control research
 Rockwell XFV-12 – Augmented wing vectored thrust VTOL
 Rotary Rocket Roton 1999 – Single stage to orbit helicopter rocket
 Ryan VZ-3 Vertiplane 1958 – Blown flap VTOL research
 Ryan XV-5 Vertifan 1964 – Fan lift VTOL research
 Sawyer Skyjacker II – Low aspect ratio research aircraft

 Scaled Composites Proteus 1998 – Telecommunication relay testbed
 Schweizer SGS 1-29 1958 – Laminar flow research on wings made of metal
 Sikorsky S-69 1981 – Compound co-axial research
 Sikorsky S-72 1976 – Helicopter/aircraft hybrid research
 Sikorsky S-75 1984 – Advanced Composite Aircraft Program
 Sikorsky S-76 SHADOW 1985 – Sikorsky Helicopter Advanced Demonstrator and Operator Workload
 Stinson L-1 Vigilant – One example modified for boundary layer experiments
 Travel Air 2000 – One modified for Besler steam powered aircraft
 Vertol VZ-2 – tilt wing VTOL research
 Vought V-173 – Disk wing research for Vought XF5U
 Vought V-326 – High-altitude test aircraft
 Vought-Sikorsky VS-300 – Helicopter

See also
List of German WW II prototypes and projects

References

Lists of aircraft by role